In the early days of Islam at Mecca, the new Muslims were often subjected to abuse and persecution. The persecution lasted for twelve years beginning from the advent of Islam to Hijrah. Muhammad preached Islam secretly for three years. Then, he openly preached Islam, resulting in public prosecutions. Muhammad and his followers were first belittled and ridiculed, then persecuted and physically attacked for departing from traditional Mecca's tribal ways.

When Islam began to spread, the Makkans asked Abu Talib, the uncle and guardian to Muhammad, to hand him over to them for execution but he repeatedly refused. Abu Talib acted fast and called on the members of Banu Hashim and Banu al-Muttalib to meet at the Ka'bah and convinced them to pledge that they would protect their clansman, Muhammad. Abu Lahab, another of the Prophet's uncles and enemy, refused to take the pledge and declared he was on the side of the Quraysh.

After Abu Talib's refusal, they (Quraysh of Makka) gathered together to confer and decided to draw up a document in which they undertook not to marry women from the Banu Hashim and the Banu al-Muttalib, or to give them women in marriage, or to sell anything to them or buy anything from them (until the Prophet was given up to them to be killed). They drew up a written contract to that effect and solemnly pledged themselves to observe it. The event forced Abu Talib to move the clans to a valley called Shi'b of Abu Talib. The boycott lasted three years and was ended when relatives of the clans intervene.

In the next year when Abu Talib, his uncle who supported him in this ordeal died, Muhammed was left with no protection. The repercussions of the death of Abu Talib were in the political sphere. His successor as chief of the Banu Hashim appears to have been his brother, Abu Lahab. Although Abu Lahab had joined the 'grand alliance' against Hashim during the boycott, he is said at first to have promised to protect Muhammad in the same way as Abu Talib had done. After a time, however, Abu Lahab formally refused protection to Muhammad on the grounds that Muhammad alleged 'Abd al-Muttalib to be in Hell. The loss of security was on the surface a great disaster for Muhammad and for the cause of Islam.

In 622, Muhammad and his few hundred followers left Makkah and travelled to Madinah, knowing that Quraysh were plotting to kill him and his followers.

Overview
Slaves Sumayyah bint Khabbab, and her husband Yasir, were tortured to death by their master Abu Jahl.

Muhammad was protected somewhat by the influence of his family. Abu Lahab's wife, Umm Jamil, would regularly dump filth outside his door. An eyewitness mentioned that the worst thing he ever saw the Quraysh doing to Muhammad was that a person from Quraysh clutched his clothes.

Narrated Abdullah that while Muhammad was in the state of prostration, surrounded by a group of people from Quraysh pagans. 'Uqba bin Abi Mu'ait came and brought the intestines of a camel and threw them on the back of Muhammad. Muhammad did not raise his head from prostration until Fatima (i.e. his daughter) came and removed those intestines from his back.

Umayya Bin Khalf brutally tortured Bilal upon learning that Bilal had embraced Islam. Umayya would put a rope around Bilal's neck and drag him in the streets. In the burning hot desert heat, Umayya used to wrap Bilal in raw cow's hide. Due to the great stench of rotting hide, Bilal would find it difficult to breathe. Umayya would also chain Bilal heavily, lay him on hot sand, and put heavy stones on him.

Abu Lahab used to fling stones at Muhammad. He forced his two sons to divorce Ruqaiya and Umm Kulthum, who were daughters of Muhammad. People used to spit and throw dust at Muhammad. Makkan polytheists used to grab the hair of Uqbah and twist his neck. The slaves were often tortured by their masters for apostasy.

Migration age
Two migrations took place before the migration of Medina.

The Migration to Abyssinia (al-hijra ʾilā al-habaša), also known as the First Hijrah ( hijrah), was an episode in the early history of Islam, where Muhammad's first followers (the Sahabah) fled from the persecution of the ruling Quraysh tribe of Mecca. The Aksumite monarch who received them is known in Islamic sources as the Negus ( najāšī) Ashama ibn Abjar. Modern historians have alternatively identified him with King Armah and Ella Tsaham. Some of the exiles returned to Mecca and made the Hijrah to Medina with Muhammad, while others remained in Abyssinia until they came to Medina in 628.

This emigration takes place with 11 men and 4 women.
The earliest extant account is given in Ibn Ishaq's sira:

Another view, grounded in the political developments of the time, suggests that following the 
Sassanid capture of Jerusalem in 614 many believers saw a potential danger to the community as they were not the partisans of the Persians who both practiced 
Zoroastrianism and had earlier supported the Arabian Jews of 
Himyar. The acceptance of these Muslims into the Kingdom of Axum at precisely a moment of Persian triumph in the Levant recalls the Ethiopian foreign policy of the previous century which saw Axum and Persia compete for influence in the Arabian Peninsula.

In  almost one hundred Muslims made a second migration back to Abyssinia where they stayed protected by king Najashi (Ashama ibn Abjar) who is a just ruler.

The Meccan boycott of the Hashemites by the Quraish was proclaimed in 617.
This is a sub-article to Muhammad before Medina
The Meccan boycott of the Hashemites was a public boycott against the clan of Banu Hashim, declared in 616 (7th year of Prophethood) by the leaders of Banu Makhzum and Banu Abd-Shams, two important clans of Quraysh. According to tradition, the boycott was carried out in order to put pressure on Banu Hashim to withdraw its protection from Muhammad.

The terms imposed on Banu Hashim, as reported by Ibn Ishaq, were "that no one should marry their women nor give women for them to marry; and that no one would trade with them, and when they agreed on that they wrote it in a deed." The boycott lasted for three years but eventually collapsed mainly because it was not achieving its purpose; the boycott had caused extreme privation and the sympathizers within the Quraysh finally united to annul the agreement.

In the Islamic tradition, the Year of Sorrow (also translated  Year of Sadness) is the Hijri year in which Muhammad's wife Khadijah and his uncle and protector Abu Talib died. The year approximately coincided with 619 CE or the tenth year after Muhammad's first revelation.

After the death of Abu Talib, Muhammad became vulnerable due to the loss of clan protection granted by Abu Talib (who was also the chief of Banu Hashim). He began to be the target of physical attacks by his Meccan opponents. He visited Ta'if to look for help and invite the inhabitants to Islam, but was rejected. On the way back to Mecca, he petitioned several prominent Meccans to ask for protection. Chief Mut'im ibn 'Adi, from the Banu Nawfal clan, acceded to his request, escorted Muhammad into the city and announced the clan's protection of Muhammad.



Previous events
Previously the preaching of Islam by Muhammad had been confined to Mecca, and his success with Abu Bakr on  during the Year of Sorrow his main source of Ta'if to invite the people there to Islam.

Leaders of Ta'if
Muhammad was received by the three (Abd Yalail, Mas'ud and Habib, their father was Amr Bin Ummaya Ath Thaqafi) chiefs of the local tribes of Ta'if and they let him freely have his say, however, they paid little heed to his message. After a while they even showed signs of apprehension lest his welcome in Ta'if might embroil them with the Meccans, so they left him to be dealt with by street urchins and the riff raff of the town.

Rejection
By rejecting Muhammad's religion, the people of Ta'if ordered their children to throw rocks and stones at Muhammad and Zayd ibn Harithah to make them leave the city and never come back. Muhammad and Zayd ibn Harithah were finally turned out by mocking and jeering crowds. The rocks that were thrown at Muhammad and Zayd by the Ta'if children caused them to bleed. Both were wounded and bleeding as they left Ta'if behind them. Muhammad  bled so profusely from the stoning that his feet became clotted to his shoes and was wounded badly.

Orchard 
Once Muhammad and Zayd ibn Harithah were outside the city walls, Muhammad  almost collapsed. They went a short distance outside of the town and stopped in an orchard that belonged to Utaba and Sheba.

The owners of the orchard had seen Muhammad  being persecuted in Mecca and on this occasion they felt some sympathy toward their fellow townsman. They sent a slave (named Addas) who took Muhammad  into his hut, dressed his wounds, and let him rest and recuperate until he felt strong enough to resume his journey across the rough terrain between Ta'if and Mecca. It was there that the Angel Gabriel came to him with the Angel of the Mountains and said that if Muhammad wanted, he would blow the mountains over the people of Ta'if (or crush the people of Ta'if in between the mountains).

Muhammad  prayed:

The owners also told their Christian slave named Addas from Nineveh to give a tray of grapes to the visitors.

Muhammad  took the grape and before putting it into his mouth he recited what has become the Muslim grace: "In the name of God, Ever Gracious, Most Merciful." (Arabic Bismillah ar-Rahman, ar-Raheem). Addas became curious and inquired about the identity of Muhammad who presented himself. The conversation that ensued led Addas to declare his acceptance of Islam, so that Muhammad's  journey to Ta'if did not prove entirely fruitless.

He stayed preaching to the common people for 10 days.

Return
Muhammad sent Zayd to seek asylum for him among  4 nobles in the city. Three of them, 'Abd Yalil ibn 'Abd Kalal and then Akhnas ibn Shariq and Suhayl ibn Amr, refused but the fourth one, Mut'im ibn 'Adi, responded.

Mut'im ordered his sons, nephews and other young men of his clan to put on their battle-dress and then marched, in full panoply of war, at their head, out of the city. He brought Muhammad with him, first into the precincts of the Kaaba where the latter made the customary seven circuits, and then escorted him to his home.

Post-migration age and response

Invasion of Safwan

Muhammad ordered an attack to pursue Kurz bin Jabir Al-Fihri.  Because he attacked Prophet Muhammad's pasture in Madinah and ran away after looting Prophet Muhammad's camels.

Invasion of Sawiq

Muhammad ordered Muslims to pursue Abu Sufyan for killing 2 Muslims and burning a corn field

The tortured slaves by Quraysh in Mecca

Males 

Bilal ibn Rabah al-Habshi, tortured by Umayyah ibn Khalaf 
Abu Fakiha, Aflah ibn Yasar, tortured by Abu Jahl
Abu Fuhayra/ Abu Amr, Amir ibn Fuhayra, tortured by Abu Jahl
Khabbab ibn al-Aratt, tortured by (Umm Anmaar) Harla bint Abd-al-Uzza and (Abu Jahm) Siba'a ibn Abd-al-Uzza
Yasir ibn Amir, tortured by Abu Jahl until died
Harith ibn Yasir, also tortured by Abi Jahl until died
Abdullah ibn Yasir, also tortured by Abu Jahl until died
Ammar ibn Yasir, tortured by Abu Jahl twice
Ami Mu'mil ibn Abdullah al-Thaqafi, tortured by Abu Jahl

Females
Tags: The females were tortured by Umar ibn al-Khattab and Abu Jahl

Lubaynah,
Al-Nahdiah
Hakima bint Habib ibn Ku'ayb al-Nahdiyya al-Thaqifiyya
Umm Ubays 
Na'ilah bint al-Mu'ammil
Umm Umays 
Umm Unays
Harithah bint al-Mu'ammil
Zunayra al-Rumiya bint al-Mu'ammil
Umm Shareek
Ghaziyyah bint Jabir ibn Hakim 
al-Dawsiyah
al-Mu'ammilah
Sumayya bint Khayyat
Jariyyah bint Amr ibn al-Mu'ammil

List of Specific Recorded Instances

Muslim slaves

Male
 Abu Fakih – tied and dragged on burning sand, had a very heavy stone put on his chest 
Ammar ibn Yasir – tortured.

Female
Al-Nahdiah – tortured
Umm Ubays – tortured
Lubaynah– extensively beaten
Zinnira – beaten until she lost her eyesight temporarily.

Free Muslims
Umm Kulthum bint Muhammad – was divorced on orders of Abu Lahab 
Ruqayyah bint Muhammad – was divorced on orders of Abu Lahab
Sa'd ibn Ubadah – tortured and almost killed.

References

Life of Muhammad
Persecution of Muslims
Hijrah